This is a list of flag bearers who have represented Equatorial Guinea at the Olympics.

Flag bearers carry the national flag of their country at the opening ceremony of the Olympic Games.

See also
Equatorial Guinea at the Olympics

References

Equatorial Guinea at the Olympics
Equatorial Guinea
Olympic flagbearers